Stephen Odom (born September 5, 1952 in Oakland, California) is a former American football wide receiver and kick returner in the National Football League. He played college football for Utah, where he twice finished second in the country in receiving touchdowns with 11 his sophomore and 8 his junior year, and led the country in kickoff returns in 1972. He was a first-team All-American (as a return specialist) and Academic All-American in 1973. At the time of graduation, he held records for touchdowns (26), receiving yards in a game (177 vs Arizona St in 1972), receiving touchdowns in a season (11 in 1972) and career (19), longest kickoff return (93 yards vs Texas Tech in 1973), most career punt return yards (548), longest punt return (95 yards vs UTEP in 1973), most career kickoff returns (99) and yards (2,582), and most yards per catch in a season (22.1 in 1972; these last four records still stand).  Odom was drafted by the Green Bay Packers in the 5th round of the 1974 draft, where he played five seasons, and one with the New York Giants (1979). He went to the Pro Bowl after the 1974 season. He had both a punt and a kick return of 95 yards for a touchdown during his time with the Packers.

's NFL off-season, Steve Odom held at least 4 Packers franchise records, including:
 Most Kick Returns (career): 179
 Most Kick Ret Yds (career): 4,124
 Most Total Return Yds (career): 4,693
 Longest punt return for a touchdown: 95 yards (CHI 1974, Week 9).

See also 
 List of NCAA major college yearly punt and kickoff return leaders

References 

1952 births
Living people
Players of American football from Oakland, California
American football wide receivers
American football return specialists
Utah Utes football players
Green Bay Packers players
National Conference Pro Bowl players
New York Giants players